Apple Pencil is a line of wireless stylus pen accessories designed and developed by Apple Inc. for use with supported iPad tablets.

The first-generation Apple Pencil was announced alongside the first iPad Pro on September 9, 2015. It communicates wirelessly via Bluetooth and has a removable cap that conceals a Lightning connector used for charging. The Pencil is compatible with the first- and second-generation iPad Pro models, and the sixth through tenth-generation iPad models (with the latter requiring a USB-C adapter). 

The second-generation Apple Pencil was announced on October 30, 2018, alongside the third-generation iPad Pro, and is used with most iPad models that contain a USB-C port (excluding the tenth-generation iPad). It uses a magnetic connector on the side of the tablet for charging rather than a Lightning connector, and includes touch-sensitive areas that can be tapped to perform actions within supported apps.

Apple has promoted the Pencil as being oriented towards creative work and productivity; during its unveiling, the Pencil's drawing capabilities were demonstrated using the mobile version of Adobe Photoshop, and its document-annotation capabilities were shown on several Microsoft Office apps.

Specifications

First generation 
The Apple Pencil has pressure sensitivity and angle detection, and it was designed for low latency to enable smooth marking on the screen. The Pencil and the user's fingers can be used simultaneously while rejecting input from the user's palm. One end of the device has a magnetically-fastened removable cap which covers a Lightning connector which is used for charging from an iPad's Lightning port. The initial charge lasts about twelve hours, but fifteen seconds of charging provides sufficient power for 30 minutes of use. It also ships with a female-to-female Lightning adapter that allows it to be used with charging cables.

The Apple Pencil uses an STMicroelectronics STM32L151UCY6 Ultra-low-power 32-bit RISC ARM-based Cortex-M3 MCU running at 32 MHz with 64 KB of flash memory, a Bosch Sensortech BMA280 3‐axis accelerometer and a Cambridge Silicon Radio (Qualcomm) CSR1012A05 Bluetooth Smart IC for its Bluetooth connection to the iPad. It is powered by a rechargeable 3.82 V, 0.329 Wh lithium-ion battery.

The first-generation Apple Pencil is compatible with iPad models with a Lightning port released since 2018, including the  first- and second-generation iPad Pro models, third-generation iPad Air, fifth-generation iPad Mini, sixth-generation 9.7-inch iPad, and the seventh, eighth, and ninth-generation 10.2-inch iPad models. It also supports the tenth-generation iPad released in 2022, but requires a dongle (similar to the aforementioned Lightning adapter) to connect it to a USB-C cable for charging. Apple began to bundle this dongle with Pencil units in October 2022, and it can be purchased separately by existing owners.

Second generation 
On October 30, 2018, Apple announced an updated Pencil alongside the third-generation iPad Pro. It is similar in design and specifications to the first model, but without the detachable connector, and part of the stylus is flattened to inhibit rolling. It contains tap-sensitive zones on its sides that can be mapped to functions within apps. Custom laser engraving is available when purchased via the Apple Store online. 

Rather than a physical Lightning connector, the second-generation Pencil is paired and charged using a proprietary magnetic wireless charging connector on the tablet instead. As such, it is only supported by the third, fourth, fifth and sixth-generation iPad Pro, sixth-generation iPad Mini, and the fourth- and fifth-generation iPad Air. All of these models have USB-C connectors instead of Lightning, making them physically incompatible with the first-generation Pencil.

See also
 List of iPad accessories
 Surface Pen
 Microsoft Tablet PC
 Samsung Galaxy Note series
 Pen computing

References

External links

  (official website)

Apple Inc. peripherals
Apple Inc. hardware
IPad styluses
Products introduced in 2015